ENS Al-Aziz (F 904) (lit. "powerful" or "mighty") is the lead ship of s of the Egyptian Navy.

Design and description 
Al-Aziz is a MEKO A-200EN frigate, designed by Blohm + Voss. The ship has a complement of 120 personnel.

The ship is armed with one Otobreda 127 mm/64 gun and four 20 mm Oerlikon Searanger 20 remote weapon systems. For surface warfare, Al-Aziz are equipped with eight Exocet MM40 Block 3 anti-ship missile launchers, consisted of two quad launchers, and 32 vertical launching system cells for VL MICA NG anti-aircraft missiles. For anti-submarine warfare, she is equipped with two twin 324 mm torpedo tubes for MU90 Impact and DM2A4 torpedoes.

Her sensors and electronic systems consisted of Thales NS-110 4D active electronically scanned array air/surface surveillance radar, satellite communication system, towed array sonar, Thales SCORPION 2 ECM and ESM system.

The frigate's countermeasures systems consisted of two 32-tube Rheinmetall Multi Ammunition Softkill System (MASS) decoy launchers and decoy launchers for Leonardo WASS C310 surface anti-torpedo countermeasure systems.

Al-Aziz has a flight deck and hangar capable to accommodate two helicopters and a vertically-launched drone, and two boats.

Construction and career 
The Egyptian government signed a US$2.7 billion contract with ThyssenKrupp Marine Systems (TKMS) in November 2018 for four MEKO A-200EN frigates and training program for its crews. Three ships were constructed in Germany, with the fourth ship to be built in Egypt.

Work on the construction of the ship was started with the first steel cutting ceremony in September 2019, with her keel was laid down in 2020. The frigate was launched in late April 2021 at Stahlbau Nord GmbH shipyard in Bremerhaven and was fitted out at TKMS facility in Kiel. The ship was named as Al-Aziz in July 2021. She started sea trials in April 2022. 

Al-Aziz was handed over to the Egyptian Navy at a ceremony held in Bremerhaven on 14 October 2022. She then sailed for her homeport in Alexandria. The frigate arrived at Alexandria Naval Base in 2 November 2022.

References

External links

Al Aziz Frigate
الفرقاطة "العزيز" تنضم للقوات المسلحة المصرية (The frigate "Al-Aziz" joins the Egyptian armed forces) by skynewsarabia.com

2021 ships
Ships built in Bremen (state)
Frigates of the Egyptian Navy